Newton Street is a street-level bus station on the Washington Street branch of the MBTA Silver Line bus rapid transit service. It is located on Washington Street just south of East Newton Street and West Newton Street in the South End neighborhood of Boston, Massachusetts near the Boston University Medical Campus. The stop is served by the SL4 and SL5 Silver Line routes as well as several local MBTA bus routes. Like all Silver Line stops, Newton Street is accessible.

Silver Line service on Washington Street began on July 20, 2002, replacing the route 49 bus. Service levels doubled on October 15, 2009, with the introduction of the SL4 route.

References

External links

MBTA: Washington Washington St @ E Newton St, Washington St @ W Newton St

Silver Line (MBTA) stations